Helcogramma springeri, known commonly as the Springer's triplefin, is a species of triplefin blenny in the genus Helcogramma. It was described by P.E. Hadley Hansen in 1986. The specific name honours the ichthyologist Victor G. Springer of the National Museum of Natural History. This species is found in the western Pacific Ocean from Indonesia and the Philippines to northern Australia, including the Great Barrier Reef.

References

Springer's triplefin
Fish described in 1986